The 11th Maryland Volunteer Infantry Regiment was an infantry regiment that served in the Union Army during the American Civil War.

Service
The 11th Maryland Infantry was organized at Baltimore, Maryland, and mustered in on June 15, 1864, for 100 days under the command of Colonel William T. Landstreet.

The regiment was attached to 3rd Separate Brigade, VIII Corps, Middle Department, to July 1864. 1st Separate Brigade, VIII Corps, to October 1864.

The 11th Maryland Infantry mustered out of the service at Baltimore on June 15, 1865.

Detailed service
Moved to Monocacy Junction July 1, 1864. Guard duty at Monocacy and Mt. Airy, Maryland, until October 1, 1864. Battle of Monocacy July 9. Mustered out October 1, 1864. The regiment reorganized into three companies for one year service in December 1864. Companies A, B, and C were then consolidated with the 1st Eastern Shore Regiment January 1865. Company C on detached service at Relay House, Baltimore & Ohio Railroad. Company I at Baltimore. Rest of the regiment at Fort Delaware.

Commanders
 Colonel William T. Landstreet

Casualties
The regiment lost a total of 29 men during service, all due to disease.

See also

 List of Maryland Civil War Units
 Maryland in the American Civil War

References
 Dyer, Frederick H.  A Compendium of the War of the Rebellion (Des Moines, IA:  Dyer Pub. Co.), 1908.
 Wilmer, L. Allison. History and Roster of Maryland Volunteers, War of 1861-5 (Baltimore, MD:  Press of Guggenheimer, Weil, & Co.), 1898.
Attribution

External links
 Monocacy Battlefield

Military units and formations established in 1864
Military units and formations disestablished in 1865
Units and formations of the Union Army from Maryland
1864 establishments in Maryland